Herbert Zipper Concert Hall is a 415-seat music venue located on the campus of the Colburn School in Los Angeles, California, United States.  In addition to serving as a performance space for the school, it also is home to Monday Evening Concerts, Southwest Chamber Music, Piano Spheres, VOX Femina Los Angeles, and Musica Angelica.  The Los Angeles Chamber Orchestra performs part of its season there.  It also regularly hosts many other distinguished performers, and has served as a venue for the Los Angeles Philharmonic's Chamber Music Society and "Green Umbrella" New Music Group series.

It is named after musician and educator, Herbert Zipper.

References

Music venues in California
Concert halls in California
Music venues completed in 2008